Vala Flosadóttir (born 16 February 1978 in Reykjavík) is an Icelandic former athlete competing in the pole vault.

Biography
She saw her heyday in the late nineties, when she set five world junior records and two world indoor records. She won various competitions, the greatest performance being the bronze at the 2000 Olympics with 4.50 metres, her lifetime best. She is the only woman from Iceland to win an Olympic medal.

Achievements

References

1978 births
Living people
Athletes (track and field) at the 2000 Summer Olympics
Vala Flosadottir
Vala Flosadottir
Vala Flosadottir
World Athletics Championships athletes for Iceland
Vala Flosadottir
Vala Flosadottir
Olympic bronze medalists in athletics (track and field)
Goodwill Games medalists in athletics
Medalists at the 2000 Summer Olympics
Competitors at the 1998 Goodwill Games